was a village located in Naka District, Shimane Prefecture, Japan.

As of 2003, the village had an estimated population of 1,718 and a density of 16.28 persons per km2. The total area was 105.50 km2.

On October 1, 2005, Yasaka, along with the towns of Asahi, Kanagi and Misumi (all from Naka District), was merged into the expanded city of Hamada.

Dissolved municipalities of Shimane Prefecture